Tungsten diselenide is an inorganic compound with the formula WSe2.  The compound adopts a hexagonal crystalline structure similar to molybdenum disulfide. Every tungsten atom is covalently bonded to six selenium ligands in a trigonal prismatic coordination sphere while each selenium is bonded to three tungsten atoms in a pyramidal geometry. The tungsten–selenium bond has a length of 0.2526 nm, and the distance between selenium atoms is 0.334 nm.  It is a well studied example of a layered material.  The layers stack together via van der Waals interactions. WSe2 is a very stable semiconductor in the group-VI transition metal dichalcogenides.

Structure and properties 
The hexagonal (P63/mmc) polymorph 2H-WSe2 is isotypic with hexagonal MoS2. The two-dimensional lattice structure has W and Se arranged periodically in layers with hexagonal symmetry. Similar to graphite, van der Waals interactions hold the layers together; however, the 2D-layers in WSe2 are not atomically thin. The large size of the W cation renders the lattice structure of WSe2 more sensitive to changes than MoS2.

In addition to the typical semiconducting hexagonal structure, WSe2 exists in another polymorph, a metallic octahedral coordination phase 1T-WSe2 based on a tetragonal symmetry with one WSe2 layer per repeating unit. The 1T-WSe2 phase is less stable and transitions to the 2H-WSe2 phase. WSe2 can form a fullerene-like structure.

Synthesis
Heating thin films of tungsten under pressure from gaseous selenium and high temperatures (>800 K) using the sputter deposition technique leads to the films crystallizing in hexagonal structures with the correct stoichiometric ratio.

W  +  2 Se   →   WSe2

Potential applications 

Transition metal dichalcogenides are semiconductors with potential applications in solar cells and photonics. Bulk  has an optical band-gap of ~1.35 eV with a temperature dependence of −4.6 eV/K.  photoelectrodes are stable in both acidic and basic conditions, making them  potentially useful in electrochemical solar cells.

The properties of  monolayers differ from those of the bulk state, as is typical for semiconductors. The resulting solar cells pass 95 percent of the incident light, with one tenth of the remaining five percent converted into electrical power. The material can be changed from p-type to n-type by changing the voltage of an adjacent metal electrode from positive to negative, allowing devices made from it to have tunable bandgaps.

References

Tungsten compounds
Selenides
Transition metal dichalcogenides
Monolayers